This is a list of airlines currently operating in Sri Lanka.

Scheduled airlines

Charter airlines

Cargo airlines

See also
 List of airlines
 List of defunct airlines of Sri Lanka
 List of defunct airlines of Asia

References

Sri Lanka
Airlines
Airlines
Sri Lanka